Juan Felipe Delgadillo Fuentes (born September 2, 1993, in San Mateo Atenco, State of Mexico) is a professional Mexican footballer who currently plays for Cartaginés.

References

External links

1993 births
Living people
Mexican expatriate footballers
Association football defenders
Potros UAEM footballers
Deportivo Toluca F.C. players
C.S. Cartaginés players
Inter Playa del Carmen players
Liga MX players
Liga Premier de México players
Liga FPD players
Footballers from the State of Mexico
People from San Mateo Atenco
Mexican footballers